Eric Eve is an author, interactive fiction writer, and New Testament scholar at Harris Manchester College in Oxford. He is known in the interactive fiction community for his writings on TADS 3, including three tutorial/reference books (Getting Started in TADS 3, Learning TADS 3, and the TADS 3 Tour Guide) and several articles for Brass Lantern, a site that hosts articles about and reviews of interactive fiction. He has also authored eleven interactive fiction games, several of which have won awards at various competitions. In the academic field, Eric Eve has also written two books relating to the New Testament, The Healer from Nazareth: Jesus' Miracles in Historical Context and The Jewish Context of Jesus' Miracles.

Contributions
Eric Eve's contributions to interactive fiction include the games Nightfall (2nd-place winner of the Interactive Fiction Competition (IFComp)) and The Elysium Enigma (winner of the 2006 XYZZY Awards for both Best Game and Best Individual NPC). His writings on TADS 3 are some of the only tutorials available for that language, and he has also written a significant comparison of TADS 3 and Inform 7, the two most popular languages for writing interactive fiction.

Works

References

External links
 Eric Eve's homepage
 Eric Eve's entry on the IFWiki
 Eric Eve's TADS 3 tutorials on the TADS 3 Bookshelf

Video game programmers
Interactive fiction writers
New Testament scholars
Living people
Year of birth missing (living people)
Fellows of Harris Manchester College, Oxford